Richard Wyot MA (also Wyott) (died 1463) was a Canon of Windsor from 1436 to 1449 and Archdeacon of Middlesex from 1443 to 1463.

Career
He was appointed:
Prebendary of Empringham in Lincoln Cathedral 1432
Rector of Bainton, East Yorkshire 1433
Rector of Huggate, East Yorkshire 1434-1443
Dean of the Chapel of Humphrey of Lancaster, 1st Duke of Gloucester
Archdeacon of Middlesex 1443 
Prebendary of Brondesbury in St Paul's Cathedral 1444-1449
Rector of Barley, Hertfordshire 1454

He was appointed to the fifth stall in St George's Chapel, Windsor Castle in 1436, a position he held until 1459.

Notes 

Canons of Windsor
Archdeacons of Middlesex
1463 deaths
Year of birth missing